Taligan (Magamiya) is a village community in Zonzon district of Zangon Kataf Local Government Area, southern Kaduna state in the Middle Belt region of Nigeria. The postal code for the village is 802143. The nearest airport to the community is the Yakubu Gowon Airport, Jos.

Geography

Landscape
Taligan possesses an elevation of 682m.

Climate

Settlements
 Before 2017, it used to be a district of its own. However, it was later merged with Zonzon district. Among the settlements in this district were:
 Apyia Babum
 Aza Akat
 Chen Akoo
 Makunanshyia
 Manyi Sansak
 Mawuka
 Taligan (Agami) I
 Taligan (Agami) II

Notable people
 AVM Ishaya Aboi Shekari (rtd.), military service
 Agwam (Sir) Dominic Gambo Yahaya (KSM), Agwatyap II

See also
 Atyap chiefdom
 List of villages in Kaduna State

References

Populated places in Kaduna State
Atyap chiefdom